Education in Armenia is held in particular esteem in Armenian culture. Education developed the fastest out of the social services, while health and welfare services attempted to maintain the basic state-planned structure of the Soviet era, following Armenia's independence in 1991. Today, Armenia is trying to implement a new vision for its higher education system while pursuing the goals of the European Higher Education Area. The Ministry of Education and Science oversees education in the country.

Literacy rate

A literacy rate of 100% was reported as early as 1960. The numeracy level was amongst the lowest in the late 18th and 19th centuries, which might be an outcome of Ottoman and Persian education policies that only gradually improved during the Russian period. In the communist era, Armenian education followed the standard Soviet model of complete state control (from Moscow) of curricula and teaching methods and close integration of education activities with other aspects of society, such as politics, culture, and the economy. As in the Soviet period, primary and secondary education in Armenia is free, and completion of secondary school is compulsory.

In the early 1990s, Armenia made substantial changes to the centralized and regimented Soviet system. Because at least 98% of students in higher education were Armenian, curricula began to emphasize Armenian history and culture. Armenian became the dominant language of instruction, and many schools that had taught in Russian closed by the end of 1991. Russian is still widely taught, however, as a second language. Today, learning English is rapidly growing among Armenia's youth with several programs being implemented by the British Council aimed at learning English language and development of skills among youth. In September 2018, a decision was made by the Armenian government to open the first Chinese language school in Yerevan. This school will become the first link in a network of technically equipped educational institutions with an in-depth learning of Chinese and is set to become the largest training center for teaching Chinese not only in Armenia, but also in Eastern Europe and the CIS region.

Educational institutions

In the 1990-91 school year, the estimated 1,307 primary and secondary schools were attended by 608,800 students. Another 70 specialized secondary institutions had 45,900 students, and 68,400 students were enrolled in a total of ten post-secondary institutions that included universities. In addition, 35% of eligible children attended preschools. In the 1988-89 school year, 301 students per 10,000 population were in specialized secondary or higher education, a figure slightly lower than the Soviet average. In 1989, some 58% of Armenians over age 15 had completed their secondary education, and 14% had higher education.

In 1992, Armenia's largest institution of higher learning, Yerevan State University, had 18 departments, including ones for social sciences, sciences, and law. Its faculty numbered about 1,300 teachers and its student population about 10,000 students. The Yerevan Architecture and Civil Engineering Institute was founded in 1989.

On the basis of the expansion and development of Yerevan State University, a number of higher education independent institutions were formed including the Medical Institute separated in 1930 which was set up as a medical faculty. In 1980, Yerevan State Medical University (YSMU) was awarded one of the main awards of the former USSR — the Order of the Red Banner of Labour for training qualified specialists in health care and valuable service in the development of medical science.

In 1995, YSMI was renamed to YSMU and since 1989 it has been named after Mkhitar Heratsi, a medieval doctor. Mkhitar Heratsi was the founder of Armenian Medical school in Cilician Armenia. The doctor played the same role in Armenian medical science as Hippocrates in Old Greek, Galen in Roman, and Ibn Sina in Arabic medicine.

The YSMU is a medical institution, corresponding to international requirements, trains medical staff from Armenia and neighboring countries (Iran, Syria, Lebanon, Georgia) and from several other countries across the world. A great number of foreign students from India, Nepal, Sri Lanka, the United States and Russia study together with Armenian students. The university is ranked among the famous higher medical institutions and takes its honorable place in the World Directory of Medical Schools, published by the WHO. The Foreign Students' Department for the Armenian diaspora was established in 1957; it later was enlarged and the enrollment of foreign students began.

Other schools in Armenia include the American University of Armenia, the European University of Armenia, QSI International School of Yerevan, and the Eurasia International University (EIU). The EIU is a private higher education institution established in Yerevan in 1996. On 13 March 1997, EIU was fully accredited based on the decision made by the Ministry of Science and Education. Since then, the EIU was authorized to issue State Diplomas. Starting from September 2007, Eurasia International University has fully conformed to the requirements of the Bologna Process.

COAF SMART educational center in Lori province provides residents of Armenia’s rural communities an opportunity to obtain a non-formal education and skills development, offering free training in information technology, art, communication, ecology, healthy lifestyle, business and civic skills.

Armenia has a comparatively large number of tertiary institutions, there are 65 public and private higher education institutions. Of these, 23 are public, non-profit universities; 4 are interstate (defined as institutions established following an agreement between the Republic of Armenia and a foreign government, or with state participation) universities (non-profit private/public institutions and foundations established through international agreements); and 31 are private, for-profit institutions. The total includes seven branch campuses of Russian, Ukrainian and Belarusian public and private universities.

Higher education agreements
Armenia has signed the Lisbon Recognition Convention in 1997 and the Bologna Process, an agreement between European countries to ensure comparability in the standards and quality of higher-education qualifications in 2005 and subsequently became a full member of the European Higher Education Area. Armenia is also a member of the European University Association, the European Students' Union, and an associate member of Horizon Europe.

Since 2004, Armenian higher educational institutions and individual students have been involved in the European Union's Erasmus Mundus mobility programmes, the Jean Monnet Programme, and from 2015 in various Erasmus Programme projects. Armenia is also a TEMPUS (Trans-European Mobility Programme for University Studies) partner country, which allows structured cooperation between higher education institutions in EU member states and partner countries. In addition, thanks to the Erasmus+ capacity building projects, Armenian universities have been able to upgrade their administrative and organizational structures and modernize study courses.

Another major reform in Armenian higher education system included the establishment of a quality assurance agency that has been incorporated into the European Association for Quality Assurance in Higher Education (ENQA) and that was added to the European Quality Assurance Register for Higher Education (EQAR) in 2017. The standards and procedures for quality assurance, as well as for institutional and program accreditation, were developed and approved consistent with the European Standards and Guidelines for Quality Assurance.

A European Union-Armenia Education Policy Dialogue was inaugurated in March 2019 to support the continued reform in the education sector.

Student absenteeism

According to two studies carried out with the help of UNICEF — "Child Labour in Armenia" and "School Wastage Focusing on Student Absenteeism in Armenia" — a rapidly growing student absenteeism and dropout rate are closely linked to child labor and the quality of education in Armenia. Between 2002 and 2005 school dropout rates grew at the rate of 250% a year. In 2002-2003 total dropouts were 1,531 students; in 2004-2005 this number increased to 7,630.

After school education 
There are several new, technology based education centers in Armenia that provide youth with 21st century skills and knowledge to advance in their field, such as the Tumo Center for Creative Technologies, Children of Armenia Fund SMART center, among others.

See also
AEGEE Yerevan
Armenian-language schools outside Armenia
Armenian National Students Association
Children of Armenia Fund
European Youth Parliament – Armenia
List of universities in Armenia
List of universities in Yerevan
Tumo Center for Creative Technologies

References

External links
 Araratian Baccalaureate